Robert O'Shea "Shea" Salinas (born June 24, 1986) is an American former professional soccer player who played as a winger.

Career

Youth and college
After attending Grapevine High School in Grapevine, Texas, Salinas played college soccer at Furman University, where he was named to the NSCAA All-America Third Team and the NSCAA All-South Region First Team in 2007, and the NSCAA All-South Region Third Team in 2006, as well as receiving First Team All Southern Conference honors in both 2007 and 2006. During his days at Furman University, Salinas was a brother in the Tau Kappa Epsilon fraternity. During his college years, Salinas played with both the DFW Tornados and Carolina Dynamo in the USL Premier Development League.

Professional
Salinas was drafted 15th overall by the expansion San Jose Earthquakes in the 2008 MLS SuperDraft. He made his MLS debut in the Quakes' season opener against Los Angeles Galaxy on April 3, 2008. He scored his first Quakes goal during a 3-2 loss against Kansas City Wizards on October 18, 2008. He also spent part of the 2008 season on loan with Charleston Battery in the USL First Division. He also holds the career assist record for the San Jose Earthquakes.

Salinas was selected by Philadelphia Union in the 2009 MLS Expansion Draft on November 25, 2009.

On November 24, 2010, Salinas was selected by Vancouver Whitecaps FC in the 2010 MLS Expansion Draft. Salinas scored his first goal in a Whitecaps jersey on August 27, in a game against the Houston Dynamo.

On November 30, 2011, Salinas was sent from the Vancouver Whitecaps to the San Jose Earthquakes in exchange for allocation money. On September 28, 2022, he announced his retirement as an active player after the conclusion of the 2022 season.

Personal life
Born in the United States, Salinas is of Mexican descent.

Statistics

Gallery

References

External links
 
 Furman bio

1986 births
Living people
Furman Paladins men's soccer players
American soccer players
American sportspeople of Mexican descent
DFW Tornados players
North Carolina Fusion U23 players
San Jose Earthquakes players
Charleston Battery players
Philadelphia Union players
Penn FC players
Vancouver Whitecaps FC players
Expatriate soccer players in Canada
USL League Two players
Major League Soccer players
USL First Division players
USL Second Division players
San Jose Earthquakes draft picks
Soccer players from Texas
Sportspeople from the Dallas–Fort Worth metroplex
People from Grapevine, Texas
Association football defenders
Association football midfielders